Ryan M. Johnson (born June 14, 1976) is a Canadian former professional ice hockey centre. He currently works as assistant to the general manager of the Vancouver Canucks of the National Hockey League (NHL) and as the general manager for their American Hockey League (AHL) development team, the Abbotsford Canucks.

Playing career

Panthers and Lightning
Johnson was drafted by the Florida Panthers in the second round, 36th overall, of the 1994 NHL Entry Draft. He subsequently played two seasons of college hockey with the University of North Dakota. He scored 19 points in 21 games, splitting the 1995–96 season with the Canadian national team.

In his first three seasons with the Panthers, Johnson played with Florida's American Hockey League (AHL) affiliates, the Carolina Monarchs and the Beast of New Haven. In 1999–2000, he earned a full-time roster spot with the Panthers, but was traded during that season to the Tampa Bay Lightning with Dwayne Hay in exchange for Mike Sillinger on March 14, 2000.

Johnson spent one full season with the Lightning, scoring 21 points in 2000–01.  On July 10, 2001, he was traded back to the Panthers with a sixth-round draft pick (later traded back to Tampa Bay) in 2003 in exchange for Václav Prospal. However, he missed the majority of his first season back in Florida from a head injury suffered on December 22, 2001, against the St. Louis Blues.

St. Louis Blues

Near the trade deadline of the next season, he was placed on waivers and acquired by the St. Louis Blues on February 19, 2003. Johnson spent four full seasons with the Blues, playing with the Missouri River Otters of the United Hockey League (UHL) during the 2004–05 NHL lockout. After posting 18 points and leading all forwards in the league in shot blocks with 105 in 2007–08, Johnson became an unrestricted free agent in the off-season; he signed a two-year, $2.3 million contract with the Vancouver Canucks.

Vancouver Canucks
Playing his first season in Vancouver, Johnson broke a finger on his right hand while blocking a shot in November against the Minnesota Wild. He played with the injury for two games before being pulled from the lineup. It was then revealed that Johnson had also suffered a broken bone in his left foot in the third game of the season, which he had played through for six weeks. After missing 20 games, Johnson returned to the lineup on January 9, 2009, despite still feeling considerable pain in his fractured finger. After completing his first season in Vancouver with 2 goals and 9 points in 62 games, it was revealed that off-season surgery was required for the injured finger.

Nearly a month into the 2009–10 season, Johnson was involved in a head-first collision into the end boards in a game against the Detroit Red Wings on October 27, 2009. After chipping the puck into the offensive zone, Johnson lost his balance trying to skate around Detroit defenceman Nicklas Lidström and slid heavily into the boards with his shoulder and neck. He was taken off the ice in a stretcher after laying motionless on the ice for several moments. After missing five games with a concussion, he was later sidelined for 12 games in January 2010 with a broken foot.  He played through lingering injuries on both feet until suffering another broken foot while blocking a shot in early April. Limited to 58 games, Johnson scored one goal and five points.

Chicago Blackhawks
After not receiving a contract extension from the Canucks, Johnson became an unrestricted free agent. Unsigned to start the 2010–11 season, he was given a professional tryout with the Chicago Blackhawks' AHL affiliate, the Rockford Icehogs, in December 2010. He played one game for the Icehogs before signing a one-year deal with the Blackhawks. Immediately recalled after the deal, Johnson played his first game with the Blackhawks on December 17, 2010.

Personal life
Johnson was born to Jim and Judy Johnson in Thunder Bay, Ontario, on June 14, 1976. He has a sister, Sarah, and two older brothers: Greg, who played with the Detroit Red Wings, Pittsburgh Penguins, Chicago Blackhawks, and Nashville Predators; and Corey.  After his father lost a battle with cancer on June 7, 2008, at age 63, Johnson completed a 42.2-kilometre marathon the following year on June 20, 2009, in Duluth, Minnesota, as a tribute.  He finished the run in just under four hours at three hours, 59 minutes and 52 seconds.

Career statistics

Regular season and playoffs

References

External links

Ryan Johnson's TSN profile

1976 births
Abbotsford Canucks coaches
Beast of New Haven players
Canadian ice hockey centres
Carolina Monarchs players
Chicago Blackhawks players
Florida Panthers draft picks
Florida Panthers players
Ice hockey people from Ontario
Sportspeople from Thunder Bay
Living people
Missouri River Otters players
Rockford IceHogs (AHL) players
St. Louis Blues players
Tampa Bay Lightning players
North Dakota Fighting Hawks men's ice hockey players
Vancouver Canucks coaches
Vancouver Canucks players
Canadian ice hockey coaches